Coccinella septempunctata, the seven-spot ladybird (or, in North America, seven-spotted ladybug or "C-7"), is the most common ladybird in Europe. Its elytra are of a red colour, but punctuated with three black spots each, with one further spot being spread over the junction of the two, making a total of seven spots, from which the species derives both its common and scientific names (from the Latin  = "seven" and  = "spot").

Biology 

Although C. septempunctata larvae and adults mainly eat aphids, they also feed on Thysanoptera, Aleyrodidae, on the larvae of Psyllidae and Cicadellidae, and on eggs and larvae of some beetles and butterflies. There are one or two generations per year. Adults overwinter in ground litter in parks, gardens and forest edges and under tree bark and rocks.

C. septempunctata has a broad ecological range, generally living wherever there are aphids for it to eat. This includes, amongst other biotopes, meadows, fields, Pontic–Caspian steppe, parkland, gardens, Western European broadleaf forests and mixed forests.

In the United Kingdom, there are fears that the seven-spot ladybird is being outcompeted for food by the harlequin ladybird. 

Their distinctive spots and conspicuous colours warn of their toxicity, making them unappealing to predators. The species can secrete a fluid from joints in their legs which gives them a foul taste. A threatened ladybird may both play dead and secrete the unappetising substance to protect itself. The seven-spot ladybird synthesizes the toxic alkaloids, N-oxide coccinelline and its free base precoccinelline; depending on sex and diet, the spot size and coloration can provide some indication of how toxic the individual insect is to potential predators.

Distribution 

The species can be found in Europe, North Africa, Australia, Cyprus, European Russia, the Caucasus, Siberia, the Russian Far East,  Belarus, Ukraine, Moldova, the Transcaucasia, Kazakhstan, Middle Asia, Western Asia, Middle East, Afghanistan, Mongolia, China, North and South Korea, Pakistan, Nepal, North India, Japan, Sri Lanka, southeast Asia, and tropical Africa.

Interaction with humans

Biological control, introductions, and infestations 

The species has been repeatedly introduced to North America as a biological control agent to reduce aphid numbers. The first record of successful establishment (after numerous failed attempts to introduce the species) in the United States was in 1973. It has since spread by natural dispersion to New York and Connecticut and to Oklahoma, Georgia and Delaware by recolonization.

In North America, this species has outcompeted many native species, including other Coccinella. Massive swarms of C. septempunctata took place in the drought summer of 1976 in the UK. The species has undergone significant declines on the island of Malta, yet it is unclear whether this decline has occurred at the same rate elsewhere.

In culture 

C. septempunctata has been designated the national insect of Finland. In the United States, it is also the official state insect of five different states (Delaware, Massachusetts, New Hampshire, Ohio, and Tennessee).

References

External links 

Coccinellidae
Beetles of Europe
Biological pest control beetles
Biological control agents of pest insects
Symbols of Delaware
Symbols of Massachusetts
Symbols of Pennsylvania
Symbols of Ohio
National symbols of Finland
Beetles described in 1758
Taxa named by Carl Linnaeus